Maassluis West is a metro station in Maassluis, Netherlands. Originally opened  as a railway station, it is now part of Rotterdam Metro Line B.

History
Maassluis West station opened on 31 May 1970 as a railway station on the Hoekse Lijn operated by Nederlandse Spoorwegen (NS).

NS stopped operating the line, including Maassluis West railway station, on 1 April 2017 to enable conversion for metro train operations. The station was reopened by RET on 30 September 2019, with preview services operating on 28 September.

Services
As of 2019, Maassluis West is served by 6 trains per hour on RET Metro Line B, of which 3 per hour travel the full length of the route, and 3 travel only as far as Steendijkpolder

References

External links
Dutch Public Transport journey planner

Rotterdam Metro stations
Railway stations opened in 1970
Railway stations on the Hoekse Lijn
1970 establishments in the Netherlands
Maassluis
Railway stations in the Netherlands opened in the 20th century